The U.S. state of New Mexico first required its residents to register their motor vehicles and display license plates in 1912. , plates are issued by the New Mexico Taxation and Revenue Department through its Motor Vehicle Division. Only rear plates have been required since 1961.

New Mexico is the only state that specifies "USA" on its license plates, so as to avoid confusion with the country Mexico, which it borders to the southwest.

Passenger baseplates

1912 to 1960
The 1955 (dated 1956) issue was the first New Mexico license plate that complied with these standards.

1961 to present

Alternative passenger plates

Non-passenger plates

County coding, 1947–74
New Mexico established a numeric county-code system for its passenger and truck plates in 1947. Santa Fe County was assigned code 1, while the remaining counties were assigned codes 2 through 31 in order of the number of registered vehicles in the county. Following shifts in these numbers, codes 2 through 31 were re-allocated in 1948, after which they remained constant. Los Alamos County was created in 1949, and subsequently assigned code 32.

The codes were discontinued on passenger plates in 1972, and on truck plates in 1975. From 1976 until sometime after 1996, the county of issuance was displayed on a sticker at the top of the plate.

Cibola County was created in 1981, after the codes had been discontinued.

References

External links
History of New Mexico License Plates
New Mexico license plates, 1969–present

New Mexico
New Mexico transportation-related lists
Transportation in New Mexico